The Church of the Holy Archangels Michael and Gabriel ( - crkva sv. Arhanđela Mihaila i Gavrila), also known as the Old Orthodox Church, is a Serbian Orthodox church in Sarajevo, Bosnia and Herzegovina.  It was established in 1539. It was, however, built on older foundations.

See also 
Serbs in Sarajevo
Serbs of Bosnia and Herzegovina

References

External links 

Dabro-Bosnian Metropolitanate
Muzej Stare pravoslavne crkve u Sarajevu: Među pet u svijetu - Al Jazeera

Serbian Orthodox church buildings in Bosnia and Herzegovina
Serbian Orthodox churches in Sarajevo
Stari Grad, Sarajevo
16th-century Serbian Orthodox church buildings
Medieval Bosnia and Herzegovina architecture
Baščaršija